Sven Sømme (19 November 1904 – 2 December 1961) was a Norwegian zoologist and ichthyologist.

He was born in Ringsaker to physician Jacob Dybwad Sømme and Helene Sofie Sørensen. He was a brother of zoologist Iacob Dybwad Sømme, and his sister Ingerid was married to ship owner Sigval Bergesen the Younger. He chaired the fisheries school at Aukra in 1940, and served as Norway's fisheries inspector from 1946 to 1952. He published works on fish biology, salmon migration and entomology.

During the German occupation of Norway he was active in the clandestine intelligence organization XU. After being caught by the German soldiers while photographing near a torpedo base on Otrøya (June 1944) he managed to escape from the guards at Åndalsnes. With the help of locals including mountaineer Arne Randers Heen he scrambled through the wild mountains between Isfjorden and Eikesdalen. He walked for days through the mountains to a hiding at Atnsjøen. He fled to Sweden and eventually arrived in the United Kingdom.

His brother Iacob Dybwad Sømme was executed in March 1944.

References

1904 births
1961 deaths
People from Ringsaker
20th-century Norwegian zoologists
XU
Norwegian resistance members
Norwegian escapees
Escapees from German detention